Asaluyeh Rural District is in the Central District of Asaluyeh County, Bushehr province, Iran. At the census of 2006, its population was 31,319 in 2,476 households, at which time it was a part of Asaluyeh District in Kangan County. There were 32,977 inhabitants in 3,513 households at the following census of 2011. At the most recent census of 2016, the population of the rural district was 13,476 in 2,504 households, by which time it was in the new Asaluyeh County. The largest of its eight villages was Bid Khun, with 8,886 people.

References 

Rural Districts of Bushehr Province
Populated places in Asaluyeh County